Daniel Sutherland (1869–1955) was an American businessman and politician from Alaska.

Daniel Sutherland may also refer to:

Daniel E. Sutherland, American historian
Daniel W. Sutherland, American lawyer and government official
Daniel Sutherland Davidson (1900–1952), American anthropologist 
Daniel Sutherland House, residence in Cornwall, New York, United States, listed on the National Register of Historic Places